Bosko's Picture Show is a Warner Bros. Looney Tunes animated short directed by Hugh Harman and Friz Freleng. It was the last Looney Tunes Bosko cartoon produced by Hugh Harman and Rudolf Ising for Leon Schlesinger and Warner Bros. The duo moved on to produce cartoons for MGM, the first of which were released in 1934. The music score was a work of Frank Marsales.

Director and production

While Hugh Harman is credited with directing the film, animation historians believe that Friz Freleng was his uncredited co-director.

The attempt of Bosko to leap into a movie screen and into the film depicted on screen is a reference to the film Sherlock Jr. (1924).

The short recycles certain scenes from earlier shorts: Bosko at the Beach, Bosko's Dog Race, Bosko in Person, Bosko and Bruno, and Box Car Blues.

Plot
The film opens to an exterior shot of a movie theater. The camera moves to the interior, where curtains and barn doors open to reveal a movie screen. The screen introduces the host of the movie show, Bosko, who is playing a "Furtilizer" organ. The term itself is a play on the name Wurlitzer, as Wurlitzer pipe organs were regularly used in theaters of the time. Bosko leads the audience in the song "We're in the Money" (1933).

The film then proceeds to parody newsreels. The newsreel depicted is called Out-Of-Tone News and the accompanying tagline Sees All, Hears All, Smells All. This was a reference to Movietone News, which had the slogan Sees all, Hears All, Knows All. Various scenes of world news appear. The first of them takes place in Geneva, Switzerland, where a peace conference is supposedly taking place. Actually the attending world leaders are depicted engaging in hand-to-hand combat, while a ring announcer gives a blow-by-blow description of the action. The following scene takes place in Malibu, California. A title card reports that it is supposedly about the Sunkist Bathing Beauties enjoying the sunshine of California. The scene then contradicts the card by depicting a single, unattractive woman on a beach during a snowstorm. She is attempting to evade a tidal wave. The next scene takes place in Reno, Nevada, where boxer "Jack Dumpsey" (Jack Dempsey) is reported training for a comeback. He is depicted as a withered old man with a cane. Followed by a scene taking place in "Epsom Salts, England", depicting a race among blue-blood dogs. The defending champion Bruno, Bosko's pet dog, is depicted sniffing around and trailing his competitors. Until he finds himself chased by the Marx Brothers, equipped as dog catchers.

The final scene of the newsreel takes place in "Pretzel, Germany", where Fuehrer Adolf Hitler is depicted pursuing Jimmy Durante with an axe in hand. Hitler is depicted as a ruthless buffoon wearing lederhosen and a swastika armband, while the large-nosed Durante, an apparent nod to the Jewish nose stereotype, shouts, "Am I mortified!" The newsreel ends with the tagline It Squeaks for Itself, a reference to another slogan of Movietone News: It Speaks for Itself.

The newsreel is followed by a short subject parodying Laurel and Hardy, who are called here "Haurel and Lardy", starring in "Spite of Everything". The two comedians are depicted finding a cooling pie on a window sill and stealing it. Then they argue over ownership of the pie. The pie switches hands many times, until Haurel ends their rivalry by pieing Lardy. In retaliation, Lardy uses a discarded pot to hit Haurel. The subject ends with Haurel crying.

The last film of the show follows. It is a "TNT Pictures" production, its logo featuring a roaring (and burping) lion. This is a reference to Leo the Lion, the mascot of Metro-Goldwyn-Mayer. The film itself is a melodrama set in the 1890s, entitled "He Done Her Dirt (and How!)". Honey, Bosko's girlfriend, is depicted riding a bicycle. She is followed by the Marx Brothers, who sing Daisy Bell (Bicycle Built for Two) (1892). Then a title card introduces the villain, "Dirty Dalton (The Cur!)". Dalton hides behind a tree and manages to ambush Honey, abducting her. He then "leaps off a cliff and onto a train passing underneath", ending with his victim on top of a runaway railroad car. Honey breaks the fourth wall by asking for assistance from the audience. Bosko volunteers to save her and leaps towards the screen. He fails to enter the world of the 1890s film and goes through the screen. But his efforts leave a hole where Dalton's head should be, disabling the villain and somehow rescuing Honey. Honey applauds, Bosko raises his hands in triumph, and the animated short ends.

Profanity
When the villain first appears onscreen, Bosko shouts what sounds like "The dirty fuck." The word is not clearly heard, due to a muffled vowel and it has been argued that a flaw in the soundtrack rendered profane a more "polite" phrase, such as "dirty fox" or "dirty mug".  Animator Mark Kausler has studied the lip movements of the character and insisted that "mug" was the intended word. He initially believed that the sound flaw only appeared on the 16 mm film version, and tried to re-record the sound from a 35 mm, nitrate film to correct this, leading to no better results, since listeners still heard the disputed word as "fuck". Animation historian Jerry Beck also had several people see the film, and they all concluded that Bosko did indeed call the film villain a "dirty fuck."

According to the Looney Tunes Golden Collection: Volume 6 DVD set the subtitles for that scene read, "The dirty fox!", despite that  "The dirty fuck!" can clearly be heard. Fans have theorized that the inclusion of a really nasty curse word was most likely a parting farewell shot by Harman and Ising to Warner Bros. animation head Leon Schlesinger with whom they disputed over various matters.

Legacy
Aside from newsreels, the short is argued to be the first depiction of Hitler in an American film, although there is an earlier appearance in the August 1933 short Cubby's World Flight by the Van Beuren Studios; while flying over Germany, Cubby Bear receives smiles and waves from both Chancellor Hitler and President Paul von Hindenburg. Ironically, this short was produced by Harman-Ising after they had broke ties with Schlesinger.

Home media
This cartoon was released on the Looney Tunes Golden Collection: Volume 6 DVD set, uncut and digitally remastered.

Sources

References

External links
 
 
 Toon Zone article

1933 short films
1933 animated films
American black-and-white films
Film controversies
Cultural depictions of Adolf Hitler
Cultural depictions of Laurel & Hardy
Cultural depictions of the Marx Brothers
Cultural depictions of Jimmy Durante
Films scored by Frank Marsales
Films directed by Hugh Harman
Bosko films
Films set in the 1890s
Films set in the 1930s
Films set in a movie theatre
Animated films set in England
Films set in Germany
Films set in Malibu, California
Films set in Nevada
Films set in Switzerland
Looney Tunes shorts
Warner Bros. Cartoons animated short films
Rail transport films
African-American animated films
Short films directed by Friz Freleng
1930s Warner Bros. animated short films
Obscenity controversies in animation
Obscenity controversies in film
Television censorship
1930s English-language films
American animated short films
Animated films set in California